The Cass River Railroad is a defunct railroad which operated in Michigan during the early 1870s. The company was chartered on December 12, 1871. In 1872 it completed a  line from East Saginaw to Vassar. The line was intended to exploit the timber resources in the Cass River area. On June 4, 1872, the company was bought by the Flint and Pere Marquette Railroad (F&PM).

Notes

References 

Railway companies established in 1871
Railway companies disestablished in 1872
Defunct Michigan railroads
Predecessors of the Pere Marquette Railway